Multiple Toymakers was an American toy company.  They were one of the first toy companies to license the use of DC Comics' Superman, producing a Superman-shaped water gun in 1967.

References